Herbert Jäger (15 February 1926 – 10 December 2004) was a German footballer who competed in the 1952 Summer Olympics.

References

External links
 

1926 births
2004 deaths
German footballers
Association football defenders
Olympic footballers of Germany
Footballers at the 1952 Summer Olympics
Sportspeople from Wuppertal
Footballers from North Rhine-Westphalia